The Sword and the Sorcerer is a 1982 American sword and sorcery fantasy film co-written and directed by Albert Pyun, and starring Lee Horsley, Kathleen Beller, Simon MacCorkindale, George Maharis, Richard Lynch, and Richard Moll. The plot concerns a mercenary with a three-bladed projectile sword who rediscovers his royal heritage when he is recruited to help a princess foil the designs of a brutal tyrant, and a powerful, devil-like sorcerer, in conquering the land.

The film had initially mixed reviews, but a cult following developed. It was a box office success, grossing almost ten times its budget.

Plot 
King Titus Cromwell and his men land on Tomb Island in search of Xusia of Delos, a long-dead sorcerer who may be the key to overthrowing his rival King Richard, whose land of Ehdan is the richest in the world. Using one of Xusia's worshipers to awaken him, Cromwell convinces Xusia to join his cause. With the sorcerer's black magic at his command, Cromwell easily lays waste to Richard's formidable army.

Eventually, Cromwell becomes eager to be rid of Xusia. Fearing that the sorcerer could turn against him, he stabs Xusia with a dagger and chases him off a cliff.
With only one army left to defend the city, King Richard prepares to lead the charge against Cromwell in a last-ditch effort to save Ehdan. He orders his family to evacuate to the river, and entrusts his youngest son Talon with his triple-bladed projectile sword, instructing the boy to avenge his death should it occur.

While searching the corpse-littered battlefield, Talon comes across Mogullen, his father's closest adviser. Gravely wounded, the old soldier confirms that the battle is lost. At that moment, Talon spies his father in the distance, just seconds before his execution. Enraged, Talon wants to claim his revenge, but Mogullen warns him that Cromwell will be heading to the river to intercept the queen. Talon desperately races to the river on horseback, but is too late to prevent his mother's death at Cromwell's hands. After narrowly surviving an ambush, Talon manages to evade capture and flee from the kingdom.

Eleven years later, Talon returns as a seasoned warrior seeking to avenge his family, even as the sinister Xusia vows to repay Cromwell for his treachery. In the city of Ehdan, a rebellion has begun under Prince Mikah, son of King Richard's closest adviser, who many believe to be the rightful heir to the throne. After confirming the final plans with Machelli, Cromwell's war chancellor, Mikah relays the news to his sister Alana, but Cromwell suddenly bursts into their hideout and a battle ensues. Although Mikah is captured, Alana flees through the city streets, but is eventually cornered by Cromwell's rapacious goons. She is then rescued by Talon, who easily dispatches her assailants.

At a nearby tavern, Alana learns of her brother's imprisonment and asks Talon to rescue him, along with a faction of rebels who have been recently trapped by Cromwell's forces. Unable to bribe the lustful mercenary with gold, Alana reluctantly offers herself to him for one night. Satisfied, Talon departs on his mission, but Cromwell's men arrive shortly thereafter and capture Alana as well.

Successful in freeing the rebels, Talon infiltrates the castle through the sewers and is able to rescue Mikah, but is subsequently detected and captured by Cromwell. After forcing Alana to marry him, Cromwell invites the four neighboring kings to their wedding and feast, where he intends to assassinate them with Talon crucified in the dining hall. Before the plot can be carried out, Talon summons the strength to pull his hands free of the crucifix, just seconds before the rebels, led by Mikah, storm into the dining hall and overpower Cromwell's soldiers.

Cromwell attempts to flee the castle with Alana in tow, but Talon intercepts them. While he and the rebels clash with Cromwell's guards, Machelli takes custody of Alana and brings her to the catacombs beneath the castle, where he reveals his true identity as Xusia. Although Cromwell tries to intercede, he is overmatched by the sorcerer, but Talon is able to resist Xusia's magic powers long enough to strike him down with his projectile sword. He then engages Cromwell in combat, finally slaying the evil king. Afterwards, Talon saves Alana from a giant constrictor snake, but Xusia suddenly rises again, prompting Talon to finish off the sorcerer with a blade concealed in his gauntlet.

Having no wish to rule the kingdom, Talon yields the crown of Ehdan to Mikah, and Alana honors her commitment to spend one night with her brother's savior. As Talon and the mercenaries prepare to leave Ehdan, they are approached by Rodrigo, a member of Mikah's rebellion, who asks to join them. Talon agrees, and the group sets off for another adventure.

Cast

Release 
The Sword and the Sorcerer was released theatrically in the United States by Group 1 International Distribution Organization Ltd in April 1982.

Reception 
The film grossed $39,103,425 at the box office, making it the most profitable independent film of 1982. It even spawned a short-lived production line of three-bladed plastic swords in resemblance to Talon's.

Variety gave the film a negative review, citing its lackluster script, lack of acting talent, and fast-paced, "atrocity-a-minute" action scenes. Similarly, The New York Times described it as "nonsensical" and "inept", and Roger Ebert gave it half a star, describing it as "an Identikit movie [which] doesn't care much about character".

After this criticism, the film became a cult classic and is regarded as one of Pyun's best. The review aggregator website Rotten Tomatoes reported that 67% of critics have given the film a positive review based on 12 reviews, with an average rating of 6.10/10, making it Pyun's highest-rated film to date.

Arco Toys in conjunction with Fleetwood Toys made a number of monster figures that included the logo of the film, including a winged man with the head of a lion, and a man with the head of a cobra.

Sequel 
The Sword and the Sorcerer was originally conceived as the first in a series of several films.

A sequel, Tales of an Ancient Empire (as trailed at the end of The Sword and the Sorcerer), directed by Pyun, was released on January 24, 2012 on DVD. Kevin Sorbo, Victoria Maurette and Lee Horsley starred in the film, the latter reprising the role from the original film. Although Christopher Lambert and Yancy Butler were initially announced to appear in the film, they do not appear.

Home media
The Sword and the Sorcerer was released on DVD on April 24, 2001 by Starz/Anchor Bay.

Shout! Factory released a special edition 4K Resolution UHD Blu-ray on March 15, 2022.

See also
 The Beastmaster – a contemporaneous sword and sorcery movie
 List of American films of 1982

References

External links
 

1982 films
1980s fantasy adventure films
American fantasy adventure films
American independent films
Films about wizards
Films directed by Albert Pyun
American sword and sorcery films
1982 directorial debut films
1982 independent films
1980s English-language films
1980s American films